Eslamabad (also Romanized as Eslāmābād; also known as Bezhveh) is a village in Alan Rural District of the Central District of Sardasht County, West Azerbaijan province, Iran. At the 2006 National Census, its population was 942 in 176 households. The following census in 2011 counted 989 people in 262 households. The latest census in 2016 showed a population of 1,056 people in 302 households; it was the largest village in its rural district.

References 

Sardasht County

Populated places in West Azerbaijan Province

Populated places in Sardasht County